Venezillo arizonicus is a species of woodlouse in the family Armadillidae. It is found in North America.

References

Woodlice
Articles created by Qbugbot
Crustaceans described in 1942